Pitch Perfect is a 2012 American musical comedy film directed by Jason Moore and written by Kay Cannon. It features an ensemble cast, including Anna Kendrick, Skylar Astin, Rebel Wilson, Adam DeVine, Anna Camp, Brittany Snow, Hana Mae Lee, Alexis Knapp, Ester Dean, Kelley Jakle, Shelley Regner, Wanetah Walmsley, Ben Platt, Utkarsh Ambudkar, John Michael Higgins, and Elizabeth Banks. The plot follows Barden University's all-girl a cappella group, the Barden Bellas, as they compete against another a cappella group from their college to win Nationals. The film is loosely adapted from Mickey Rapkin's non-fiction book, titled Pitch Perfect: The Quest for Collegiate a Cappella Glory and director Jason Moore's own experiences at his alma mater, Northwestern University. Filming concluded in December 2011, in Baton Rouge, Louisiana.

The film premiered in Los Angeles on September 24, 2012 and was released on October 5, 2012 in the United States. The film received mostly positive reviews from critics and became a sleeper hit, earning over $115 million worldwide. It is the first film in the film series and was followed by two sequels, Pitch Perfect 2 (2015) and Pitch Perfect 3 (2017).

Plot
During the 2011 ICCA Finals at the Lincoln Center, Barden University's all-female a cappella group, the Barden Bellas, lose to their all-male rival group, the Barden Treblemakers, due to junior member Aubrey Posen's vomiting onstage in the middle of her solo. Four months later, aspiring DJ Beca Mitchell is a freshman at Barden University at the insistence of her father, a professor at the university, despite having no desire to attend college, instead spending her time making mash-up mixes of songs. She gets an internship at the school radio station, where she gets to know fellow freshman Jesse Swanson.

At the university's activities fair, Beca is invited to join the Bellas by seniors and current co-leaders Aubrey and Chloe Beale, but she declines. Later, Chloe hears Beca singing in the shower, convincing her to audition. Although late for the audition, Chloe allows her to perform for them anyway. She auditions with a rendition of "Cups (When I'm Gone)", getting her into the Bellas along with the tough Cynthia Rose Adams, the flirtatious Stacie Conrad, the unusually quiet Lilly Onakuramara, the bubbly Jessica Smith, the alto Ashley Jones, the comedic Patricia "Fat Amy" Hobart, and the meek Denise. Meanwhile, Jesse joins the Treblemakers.

The Bellas participate in the 2012 ICCA Regionals, where, at Aubrey's insistence, they perform the same medley that helped the Bellas advance to the Finals the previous year. In spite of their stale setlist, the group manages to place second, sending them to the Semi-Finals. After the competition, the Bellas try to break up a fight between the Treblemakers and the Tonehangers, a male alumni a cappella group. Beca and Fat Amy accidentally smash a window with the Treblemakers' trophy, alerting police who then arrest Beca. Jesse contacts her dad to bail her out, causing a rift in her relationship with both. Aubrey insists on performing the same medley a third time, despite Beca urging them to be more daring. In the midst of their performance, Beca, hoping to reinvigorate the uninterested crowd, inserts an impromptu layering of "Bulletproof" into the set.

Aubrey angrily berates Beca for this and accuses her of hooking up with Jesse, a rule breach punishable by ejection from the Bellas. Jesse overhears and attempts to deny it, leading Beca to snap at them both and quit the Bellas. Despite the judges and crowd enjoying Beca's improvization, the Bellas do not advance to the Finals due to their third-place ranking behind the Treblemakers and the Footnotes. However, Jesse's roommate Benji Applebaum finds out that Footnotes leader Timothy is a high school student and reports it, disqualifying the Footnotes and allowing the Bellas to advance to the Finals. After spring break, Beca tries to reconcile with Jesse, but he rejects her, accusing her of pushing away everyone who cares about her.

During the Bellas' rehearsal, Chloe stands up against Aubrey, sparking a fight over the pitch pipe. Beca then returns, apologizes to the Bellas for changing the set without Aubrey's permission during the Semi-Finals, and asks to be given a second chance. After all of the Bellas have a heart-to-heart conversation, Beca rejoins the group, and Aubrey relinquishes her half of the leadership to Beca. Chloe discovers that after her spring break node removal surgery, she is able to sing bass notes. Meanwhile, Treblemakers leader Bumper Allen leaves the group after being offered a job as a back-up singer for John Mayer. With Bumper gone, Jesse persuades the Trebles to let Benji join the group in Bumper's place, a position Benji was denied earlier in spite of his impressive audition.

At the Finals, the Bellas perform a modern piece arranged by Beca, which includes "Don't You (Forget About Me)", featured in The Breakfast Club, one of Jesse's favorite movies. This acts as a more effective apology, and after the performance, she and Jesse kiss. Chloe's new ability to hit bass notes contributes to a fuller, more dynamic sound in the Bellas performance. The Bellas narrowly defeat the Treblemakers and win the national championship. Six months later, auditions for new members take place.

Cast
 Anna Kendrick as Beca Mitchell, an introverted and rebellious freshman who joins the Bellas to appease her professor father.
 Skylar Astin as Jesse Swanson, an outgoing Barden freshman who hopes to become a film score composer.
 Rebel Wilson as Patricia "Fat Amy" Hobart, a confident, comical singer from Tasmania.
 Adam DeVine as Bumper Allen, the egotistical leader of the Treblemakers
 Anna Camp as Aubrey Posen, the uptight and traditionalist co-leader of the Bellas.
 Brittany Snow as Chloe Beale, the friendlier and more civil co-leader of the Bellas.
 Alexis Knapp as Stacie Conrad, a highly sexually driven singer and dancer.
 Ester Dean as Cynthia Rose Adams, a tough soul singer.
 Hana Mae Lee as Lilly Onakuramara, a strange soft-spoken student and talented beatboxer.
 Ben Platt as Benji Applebaum, Jesse's roommate, an illusionist who dreams of being a Treble.
 Utkarsh Ambudkar as Donald, Bumper's right-hand man, a lead vocalist, beatboxer, and rapper
 Michael Viruet as Unicycle, a beatboxer.
 John Michael Higgins as John Smith, a commentator for the ICCAs.
 Elizabeth Banks as Gail Abernathy-McKadden, a commentator for the ICCAs.

Kelley Alice Jakle, Wanetah Walmsley, Shelley Regner, Caroline Fourmy, and Nicole Lovince play Barden Bellas members Jessica, a bubbly and absent-minded soprano, Denise, an unobtrusive alto, Ashley, an alto and beatboxer, Mary-Elise, a short-lived member of the Bellas, and Kori, another short-lived member of the Bellas.

David Del Rio appears as Kolio, and Steven Bailey, Michael Anaya, Greg Gorenc, Brian Silver, and Wesley Lagarde appear as five unnamed members of the Treblemakers.  John Benjamin Hickey appears as Dr. Mitchell, Beca's father, a professor at Barden University, Freddie Stroma appears as Luke, Barden's radio station manager who plays Beca's DJ mixes on the air, and Jinhee Joung appears as Kimmy Jin, Beca's Korean American roommate. Joe Lo Truglio, Har Mar Superstar, Jason Jones and Donald Faison appear as the Tonehangers, an older, long-graduated a cappella group that gets into a fight with the Bellas and Treblemakers, while Christopher Mintz-Plasse plays Barden student Tommy, who organizes the school's a capella auditions.

Production
The film is based on Mickey Rapkin's 2008 period piece non-fiction book Pitch Perfect: The Quest for Collegiate a Cappella Glory. Rapkin, senior editor at  GQ magazine, spent a season covering competitive collegiate a cappella. He followed the Tufts University Beelzebubs (the inspiration for the Treblemakers), the University of Oregon Divisi (the loose inspiration for the Bellas), and the University of Virginia Hullabahoos, who have a cameo in the film. Rapkin's book mainly covers the singing, groupies, partying and rivalries. Two members of the a cappella community, Deke Sharon, who founded the International Championship of College A Cappella, and Ed Boyer, both in Rapkin's book, were brought on board to arrange songs, produce vocals and act as on-site music directors, where they ran a month-long "a cappella boot camp". The film was shot throughout campus and inside buildings at Louisiana State University in Baton Rouge, Louisiana. Elizabeth Banks is a co-producer and a co-star in the film.

Casting
The casting department included Justin Coulter, Rich Delia, Allison Estrin, and Michael Roth. Producer Elizabeth Banks appears throughout the film alongside John Michael Higgins as commentators for the competitions.

Paul Brooks stated "First and foremost, we were looking for actors who had comedic instincts and thought we'd get lucky with terrific actors who happened to be funny and can actually dance and maybe sing. It turns out we did get lucky with our cast!" According to producer Elizabeth Banks, "The character Beca required someone who was grounded, who has a strong point of view on the world, who is funny and empathetic and someone who we can all relate to and root for." Of Kendrick, she said, "Anna is all those things, and there was no other choice." Fellow producer Brooks said "I saw Anna in Up in the Air and thought it was the most exquisite, elegant, balanced, sublime performance. Anna was our first choice for the role of Beca."

When casting the character of Jesse, Max Handelman said "We were looking for a young John Cusack-type guy. We needed to find someone who was kind of awkward but not a geek, but not so cool that you're not rooting for him." Skylar Astin was chosen for the role. Of Astin's audition, Banks said the chemistry between Skylar and Anna when they read together prior to shooting was "clear and they were able to riff off each other."

Rebel Wilson was recognized for her performance in the comedy film Bridesmaids upon auditioning for the role of Fat Amy, which she won instantly. Moore recalled Wilson singing Lady Gaga's "The Edge of Glory" while beating "on her chest with her fists." He said, "I didn't even hear the end of the song because I was laughing so hard. There's this beautiful openness to the way Rebel approaches everything, and that's what works great for the character. She's fearless." Adam DeVine was personally chosen by Banks and Handelman for the role of Bumper after they saw him on the television series Workaholics. Banks confessed that she and her husband are "big Workaholics fans," and after watching one night during the film's casting, they saw DeVine and "immediately thought" he would be a good choice for Bumper. He initially declined because he was not a singer. DeVine eventually surprised Banks and Handelman with his vocal skills. Anna Camp was chosen for the role of Aubrey. Producer Max Handelman said, "Elizabeth and I were huge fans of Anna's from True Blood. Aubrey is set up as the antagonist for Beca, and Beca's already a bit hard-edged, so it was so important to find an actress who could play Aubrey as someone who could marshal the crazy but also was sympathetic."

Release
The film was released on October 5, 2012, in the United States.
In Australia, it was released on December 6, 2012.

Home media
Pitch Perfect was released on DVD, Blu-ray, and Blu-ray/DVD combo pack on December 18, 2012.  A 4K UHD Blu-Ray release followed on March 20, 2018.

Reception

Box office

Pitch Perfect grossed $65 million in North America and $50.3 million in other territories for a total gross of $115.4 million since release, against a $17 million budget.

The film opened in limited release in the United States and Canada on September 28, 2012, and wide release in the United States and Canada on October 5, 2012. It grossed $1.8 million upon its opening day of limited release and $4.9 million on its first day of wide release. In its wide opening weekend, the film opened at number three, behind Taken 2 and Hotel Transylvania, grossing $14.8 million. The opening weekend audience was 81 percent female, which is considered overwhelming. The opening weekend also attracted a younger audience with 55% of the opening weekend audience being under the age of 25. The film is the third-highest-grossing music comedy film, behind its sequel, Pitch Perfect 2, and School of Rock.

Critical response
On Rotten Tomatoes the film has an approval rating of 81% based on 154 reviews, with an average rating of 6.40/10. The site's critical consensus reads, "Pitch Perfects plot is formulaic, but the performances are excellent and the musical numbers are toe-tapping as well." On Metacritic it has a weighted average score of 66 out of 100, based on reviews from 33 critics, indicating "generally favorable reviews". Audiences surveyed by CinemaScore gave the film a grade of "A" on an A+ to F scale.

NPR's David Edelstein selected it as one of the top films of the year and Entertainment Weekly chose the soundtrack as one of the year's best. Roger Ebert gave the film 2 stars out of 4, praising Rebel Wilson for her "ebullient, unstoppable and raucous" performance, but also stating that "It's a twentysomething song-and-dance movie built around rival a cappella groups. That's more exciting than dueling string quartets, I suppose - but no, the quartets would be performing better material."

Accolades

Soundtrack

Pitch Perfect: Original Motion Picture Soundtrack was released digitally on September 25, 2012, and physically on October 2, 2012. Three of the songs from the album, including the highly covered "Cups", charted on the Billboard Hot 100. It was 2013's bestselling soundtrack album and has sold 1.2 million copies in the United States as of April 2015.

On September 14, Kira Kazantsev won Miss America 2015 after performing "Happy" with cup percussion, in a manner that was similar to Anna Kendrick's character in  Pitch Perfect.

Sequels

Pitch Perfect 2 (2015)

In December 2012, Skylar Astin revealed that he and Rebel Wilson had meetings with Universal about a potential sequel.

In April 2013, it was confirmed that a sequel would be released in 2015. Elizabeth Banks would direct the sequel with Kay Cannon returning as screenwriter. Brooks would produce for Gold Circle Films with Banks and Max Handelman producing for Brownstone Productions. Kay Cannon would co-produce with Gold Circle's Jeff Levine. Kendrick, Astin, Wilson, Camp, Snow, Platt, DeVine, Dean, Knapp, Jakle, Regner, Walmsley, Banks and  Higgins would all reprise their roles in the sequel. Additionally, Hailee Steinfeld and Chrissie Fit would join the cast as Emily and Flo, the new Barden Bellas, while Katey Sagal would join as Katherine Junk, and German YouTube star Flula Borg would appear as Pieter Kramer.

It was announced in January 2014 that the sequel would be released on May 15, 2015. On June 10, 2015, plans for a third film were officially confirmed, with Kay Cannon returning to write the script.

Pitch Perfect 3 (2017)

On June 10, 2015, a third film was officially confirmed, with Kay Cannon returning to write the script. The film was slated to be released on July 21, 2017, before being pushed back to August 4, 2017, and then moving back to the July 21 slot. Finally it was decided to be released on December 22, 2017. Several days later it was announced both Kendrick and Wilson would reprise their roles, and later Brittany Snow was also confirmed to return. Hailee Steinfeld is also going to reprise her role. On October 18, 2016, Anna Camp was also confirmed to be returning. On January 2, 2017, Ester Dean and Chrissie Fit both confirmed that they were heading to Atlanta to film the third installment, reprising their roles. Banks was going to return to direct, and also as a producer along with Max Handelman and Paul Brooks. Banks later announced that she would be stepping down as director due to scheduling conflicts and parental responsibilities, but would remain a producer. Trish Sie was later brought on as director.

Television series

In September 2021,  Universal Television announced that a television series based on the film had been ordered at Peacock, with Adam DeVine reprising his role as Bumper Allen. It will be written by Megan Amram, who serves as executive producer and showrunner, and Elizabeth Banks is also an executive producer. Other cast includes, Flula Borg, Sarah Hyland, and Jameela Jamil. Filming is set to take place in Berlin.

References

External links
 
 
 
 
 
 

2012 films
2010s buddy comedy films
2010s female buddy films
2010s musical comedy films
2010s teen comedy films
American buddy comedy films
American female buddy films
American musical comedy films
American teen comedy films
American teen musical films
Culture of Baton Rouge, Louisiana
2010s English-language films
Films scored by Christophe Beck
Films about competitions
Films based on non-fiction books
Films directed by Jason Moore
Films produced by Elizabeth Banks
Films set in 2012
Films set in Atlanta
Films set in Georgia (U.S. state)
Films set in North Carolina
Films set in universities and colleges
Films shot in Louisiana
Brownstone Productions films
Gold Circle Films films
Universal Pictures films
Pitch Perfect (films)
2012 directorial debut films
2012 comedy films
Jukebox musicals
Jukebox musical films
2010s American films